Arbus may refer to:
 Arbus, Sardinia, a commune in the province of South Sardinia, Sardinia, Italy.
 Arbus, Pyrénées-Atlantiques, a commune in the department of Pyrénées-Atlantiques in the region of Aquitaine, France.
 Arbus (surname)